Bays Area is one of the 17 constituencies in the Southern District, Hong Kong.

The constituency returns one district councillor to the Southern District Council, with an election every four years. The incumbent councillor is Fergus Fung.

Bays Area constituency is loosely based on the areas of the Shouson Hill, Deep Water Bay, Repulse Bay, Middle Bay and South Bay in the southern part of the Hong Kong Island with estimated population of 16,270.

Councillors represented

Election results

2010s

2000s

1990s

References

Shouson Hill
Repulse Bay
Constituencies of Hong Kong
Constituencies of Southern District Council
1994 establishments in Hong Kong
Constituencies established in 1994